Storm King Art Center, commonly referred to as Storm King and named after its proximity to Storm King Mountain, is an open-air museum located in New Windsor, New York. It contains what is perhaps the largest collection of contemporary outdoor sculptures in the United States. Founded in 1960 by Ralph E. Ogden as a museum for Hudson River School paintings, it soon evolved into a major sculpture venue with works from some of the most acclaimed artists of the 20th century.

History
In early 1958, after retiring from a successful career in his family's business, Star Expansion Company, Ralph E. Ogden purchased what would soon become Storm King Art Center—a 180-acre estate in Mountainville, New York. In 1960, he opened his land to the public and began the collection with a number of small sculptures he had acquired in Europe. In 1967, with the purchase of thirteen pieces from sculptor David Smith, the collection was firmly established.

The center's first sculptures were exhibited around its main building, but as time passed, the collection expanded out into the landscape, of which the sculptures became an integral part. The landscape and the main house were redesigned and molded early on by landscape architect William Rutherford and his wife Joyce Rutherford, and later by Ogden's previous business partner, Peter Stern, who had become the center's chairman and president, and by David Collins, the center's director. Stern continued to run the center after Ogden's death in 1974, and added many of its most well-known pieces.

In 1975, five monumental works by Mark di Suvero were saved from being dismantled and packed away when Peter Stern asked the artist if the sculptures could be displayed at Storm King after they were exhibited at the Whitney Museum of American Art. The pieces are now part of the center's core collection, and are prominently displayed in its South Fields.

The center continued to grow throughout the latter part of the 20th century, as sculptures were added to its permanent collection and the center exhibited works in circulation from other museums. For example, the Museum of Modern Art loaned four sculptures to the center for a year-long exhibition when its sculpture garden underwent construction in 1982.

The original 250 acres of land were expanded in 1985, when the Star Expansion Company donated two tracts of land for the center's 25th anniversary. The largest donated parcel of land was composed of 2,300 acres on the nearby Schunnemunk Mountain, which is the backdrop for many of the center's monumental sculptures, and is an important component of the character of the center and its landscape. Another gift was a one hundred-acre piece of farmland directly adjacent to the center, which has been used to house new additions to the collection.

Collection
The core collection includes pieces by modern masters, such as
Alexander Calder,
David Smith,
Mark di Suvero,
Henry Moore, Douglas Abdell, Isamu Noguchi, Richard Serra, and Louise Nevelson; these are joined with more recent large-scale sculptures by contemporary sculptors, including
Magdalena Abakanowicz,
Alice Aycock,
Andy Goldsworthy,
Alexander Liberman,
Sol LeWitt, and Roy Lichtenstein. Maya Lin's Storm King Wavefield (2009) is one of the newest additions to the collection, and consists of seven long rows of undulating land forms.

Grounds

The permanent collection of monumental works is situated throughout the grounds in four main areas: the North Woods, a wooded section in the northeast corner of the property; Museum Hill, an elevated portion on the east edge of the property along the Moodna Creek with views of the surrounding land and its sculptures; the Meadows, which includes the western edge of the park and its entrance; and the South Fields, an open expanse in the southwest portion of the center.

The landscape of Storm King Art Center has been in a state of flux from the very beginning. The expanse of rolling hills blanketed with grass and tall trees may look natural, but was carefully molded to form the perfect setting for each of its monumental works of art. The plateau on which stands a 1935 residence, designed to resemble a Norman chateau and later converted to the museum building, was torn apart in the 1950s by bulldozers gathering gravel for the construction of the New York State Thruway; it had to be rebuilt when the art center was established on the grounds. The addition of new site-specific works to the collection also meant constant changes to the center's landscape.

Membership

Storm King Art Center offers numerous programs and benefits for both members and everyday visitors to the grounds, including bicycles available for rent and guided trolley rides. Members enjoy free admission; while the center is closed to the general public in the wintertime, members have the opportunity to walk the grounds and see sculptures blanketed in snow during the season.

Influence
The Storm King site and art has been identified by collector Alan Gibbs as one source of inspiration for Gibbs Farm, his private outdoor sculpture museum and landscape in New Zealand.

See also
 List of sculpture parks

References

External links 

 
 Overview of Storm King at ArtFacts.net

Sculpture gardens, trails and parks in New York (state)
Cornwall, New York
Outdoor sculptures in New York (state)
Open-air museums in New York (state)
Art museums and galleries in New York (state)
Museums in Orange County, New York
Art museums established in 1960
1960 establishments in New York (state)